WBTR-FM (92.1 FM, "B-92.1 Country") is a radio station licensed in the city of Carrollton, Georgia, located west-southwest of Atlanta. The station plays a country music format. WBTR-FM is "Your Radio Home Of The Dawgs, Braves & Nascar!" and "Today's Best Country And All Your Favorites". The licensee is WYAI, Inc.

Current notable on-air personalities include "The World Renowned and Famous", Mitch Gray in the mornings, Michael Vincent (middays), and Brian Mooty (afternoons). The station is an affiliate of the Atlanta Braves radio network, Motor Racing Network, Performance Racing Network and Georgia Football Radio Network.

History
B-92 Country was established in Carrollton, Georgia, in 1964 with a signal strength of 3,000 watts. WBTR-FM is the only FM commercial station licensed to Carrollton, serving west Georgia and east Alabama, including Carroll, Haralson, Heard, Coweta, Douglas, Randolph, and Cleburne counties.

The station was once owned by the Tarkenton family.

References

External links
 WBTR 92.1 FM official website
 

BTR-FM
Country radio stations in the United States
Radio stations established in 1964